Nataliya Strebkova or Nataliia Strebkova (maiden name Soltan, born 6 March 1995 in Kalush Raion) is a Ukrainian runner.

Strebkova ran the Athletics at the 2020 Summer Olympics – Women's 3000 metres steeplechase where she finished eleventh in heat one in a time of 9:49.15.

Her husband is Ukrainian runner Ivan Strebkov.

References

External links
 

1995 births
Living people
Ukrainian female steeplechase runners
Olympic athletes of Ukraine
Athletes (track and field) at the 2020 Summer Olympics
Ukrainian female cross country runners
Sportspeople from Ivano-Frankivsk Oblast